Ljupcho Doriev (born 13 September 1995 in Strumica) is a Macedonian footballer who plays for Shkëndija as a left wing.

Playing career

International career
Doriev made his debut for the Macedonian national team by entering the game in the 77' minute in a 2018 FIFA World Cup qualifier against Liechtenstein, which ended in a 4-0 victory for Macedonia.

Playing career
Ljupcho Doriev started his youth career playing with Akademija Pandev in 2014 after signing his first professional contract with Horizont Turnovo where he managed to only play 5 matches in that single year. He then transferred to his youth club Akademija Pandev where he played 71 matches and scored 24 goals between the 2015-2020 seasons. After a long 5 years with the club he decided to transfer to Shkëndija where he still currently plays.

Honours
Akademija Pandev - 18/19 Macedonian Cup Winner
Shkendija - 20/21 Macedonian Champion

References

External links
 
 

1995 births
Living people
Sportspeople from Strumica
Association football defenders
Macedonian footballers
North Macedonia international footballers
FK Horizont Turnovo players
Akademija Pandev players
Macedonian First Football League players
Macedonian Second Football League players